The MTC Namibia PGA Championship was a golf tournament on the Sunshine Tour. It was founded in 2004, the year after the PGA of Namibia was formed, and played at the Windhoek Country Club, to the south of Windhoek, Namibia until 2009 when it moved to Rossmund Golf Club in Swakopmund. After not being played in 2010, it moved back to Windhoek in 2011.

In 2008, the event was played over 72 holes for the first time, having previously been contested over just three rounds, with a prize fund of 1 million rand, making it the richest event on the winter swing of the tour.

Winners

References

External links
Sunshine Tour – official site

Former Sunshine Tour events
Golf tournaments in Namibia
Recurring sporting events established in 2004
Recurring sporting events disestablished in 2011